Brazil competed at the 2012 Summer Olympics in London, from 27 July to 12 August 2012. This was the nation's twenty-first appearance at the Summer Olympics, having missed the 1928 Summer Olympics in Amsterdam. The Brazilian Olympic Committee (COB) sent a total of 258 athletes to the Games, 136 men and 122 women, to compete in 24 sports. Brazil left London with a total of 17 Olympic medals (3 gold, 5 silver, and 9 bronze), winning their third largest number of medals at a single games.

Brazilian athletes won its first ever medals in two sports: modern pentathlon, with the bronze medal won by Yane Marques in women's event, and in gymnastics, with the gold medal achieved by Arthur Zanetti in men's rings.

Summary
The good result of the Brazilian performance was packed by the expressive results of the judo team during the first days of the Games.
The first gold medal come with the judoka Sarah Menezes, in women's 48 kg category, Menezes was the first Brazilian woman judoka to  turn an Olympic champion Beijing, she had competed at the age of 18 and, inexperienced, was defeated in the first fight. The evolution in the cycle that followed was extraordinary. Sarah came to England at the height of physical, technical and psychological forms. And the result was the gold medal, with victory in the decision, over Romanian Alina Dumitru, who had been the champion in Beijing. Sarah, who won the first gold in Brazil in 2012 Summer Olympics, became the country's first judoka woman to triumph in an Olympics and was also the first gold medal in judo in 20 years, since the last to have won in the competition had been Rogério Sampaio, in Barcelona 1992. The other 3 medals in judo were bronze: Felipe Kitadai in men's 60 kg, Mayra Aguiar in women's 78 kg and Rafael Silva in men's +100 kg.

In the second week of the Games, another unprecedented event happened when the gymnast Arthur Zanetti made history again by conquering the gold medal in men's rings. Arthur Zanetti had already shown his potential in the 2011 World Artistic Gymnastics Championships when he won the silver medal. After being 4th place in the qualification to the rings final, with a score of 15.616, he won the gold medal in this event, with a score of 15.900.  He was the first gymnast from Latin America to win an Olympic medal and also the first from the southern hemisphere.

On the penultimate day of the Games, Team Brasil won its third gold medal, the only collective sport in this edition. women's volleyball competition, the incumbent Olympic champion Brazil women's national volleyball team repeated the result obtained in Beijing four years early. But, this campaign is marked by impacting tense twists On the first game against the Turkish team there was the first scare, the team almost lost the game in the fifth set. The second shock followed with the defeat to the  United States in an unlit game. In the sequence a painful game happened when an unpredictable defeat happened for the  South Korea With the combination of results so far, the team was facing a traumatic elimination, having to win at any cost the next two games (China. and Serbia.) and hoped for another combination of results in which the United States would have to win their last two games (South Korea and Turkey), which ended up happening. The upshot of this campaign of ups and downs was a dramatic quarter-final clash against  Russia This game is considered one of the greatest volleyball games of all times, in a fierce rivalry over previous clashes in recent years, such as the semi-finals of the Athens 2004 Olympic Games, the 2006 FIVB Women's Volleyball World Championship and the 2010 FIVB Women's Volleyball World Championship in all these games, Brazil ended up losing to Russia in the fifth set by extremely tight scores. This game followed the script of the previous decisive games, but with a twist, Brazil managed to reverse six match points throughout the game. However, in the fifth set, after several physical and mental tests, the team managed to win the game on the limit score of 21 to 19.

In the semi-finals, the team performance turned, at the normal and a respectful win against Japan by 3 to 0. Thus, the team managed to reach its second consecutive final against another great rival, the United States. This second game between the two teams in these games was a reissue of the final held 4 years earlier in Beijing. But this time, the story had everything to be different, since the United States was the favorite. After a harsh defeat of the US in the first set (25–11), Brazil won easily the next three sets (25–17, 25–20 and 25–17) and the team winning a second gold medal. Half of team was consecrated, since they were remnants of the team that four years earlier was also an Olympic champion: Fabiana Claudino, Fabiana de Oliveira, Paula Pequeno, Jaqueline Carvalho, Sheilla Castro and Thaísa Menezes made history to be the first Brazilian women to become two-time Olympic champions. The coach José Roberto Guimarães also wrote his name in history as the first three-time Olympic volleyball champion (male or female).

The Brazil men's national volleyball team was silver medalist of the tournament, losing the gold medal in a dramatic match by 3 to 2 to Russia. Brazilian won the first two sets, and had two gold medal match points, but led by Dmitriy Muserskiy the Russians won the next 3 sets and conquered the gold medal. In the beach volleyball two medals were conquered. Alison Cerutti and Emanuel Rego went to the gold dispute against the Germans Julius Brink and Jonas Reckermann and fought a balanced duel that, to the sadness of the Brazilian fans, ended with a tight victory of the rivals by 2 to 1 (23/21, 16/21 and 16/14) in the Men's beach volleyball . In the women's beach volleyball a bronze medal was obtained by Juliana Felisberta and Larissa França.

In the football men's tournament, the Brazil national under-23 football team led by Neymar advanced as favorite to the final against Mexico, after 5 victories in 5 matches. But a fast goal from Mexican Oribe Peralta with only 29 seconds into the first half, destabilized the Brazilian players. In the second half of the match, Peralta scored again within 74 minutes. Brazil still scored a goal in the 91 minutes, but there was no time for the tie and the match ended in 2 to 1.

In the pools of the 2012 Summer Olympics, two medals were obtained. Thiago Pereira finally won an Olympic medal in the Men's 400 m individual medley with a South American record of 4:08.86, an event where Michael Phelps was in the fourth place.César Cielo the incumbent Olympic and World Champion was the bronze medal of the Men's 50 m freestyle.

In the boxing, Brazil won medals for the first time after 44 years since the 1968 Summer Olympics in Mexico City. In the debut of the women competition in boxing, Adriana Araujo had the honor of being the first Brazilian woman to win a medal in boxing, a bronze in the Women's lightweight . She also won the 100th medal of Brazil at the Olympics. Esquiva Falcão was the silver medalist in men's middleweight after losing to the Japanese Ryota Murata by 14 to 13. Esquiva's brother Yamaguchi Falcão was the bronze medalist men's light heavyweight.

Sailors Robert Scheidt and Bruno Prada took the bronze medal in the Star class. Robert became one of the most successful Brazilian athletes in history with a total of five Olympic medals, tying the record of Torben Grael. He is also one of the sailors with the largest number of Olympic medals of all time, along with Torben Grael and British Ben Ainslie.

Finally, Brazil won a medal in the last final of the 2012 Summer Olympics: the women's event in modern pentathlon. Yane Marques was the bronze medalist with 5340 points. This was the first medal and until nowadays the only medal ever won by Brazilians in modern pentathlon at the Summer Olympics.

With Rio de Janeiro being the host city of the 2016 Summer Olympics, a Brazilian segment was performed during the closing ceremony.

Medalists

| width=78% align=left valign=top |

|  style="text-align:left; width:22%; vertical-align:top;"|

Delegation 

The Brazilian Olympic Committee selected a team of 258 athletes, 136 men and 122 women, to compete in all sports, except badminton and field hockey; it was the nation's second-largest team sent to the Olympics, failing by only five athletes short of the record in Beijing. There was only a single competitor in archery, slalom canoeing, modern pentathlon, and freestyle wrestling. Brazil also marked its Olympic return in men's basketball after a sixteen-year absence.

The Brazilian team featured three defending champions from Beijing, including long jumper Maurren Maggi and freestyle swimmer César Cielo, who both became the nation's first athletes to win gold in their sporting events. Equestrian show jumper Rodrigo Pessoa, and table tennis player Hugo Hoyama became the second and third Brazilian athlete to compete in six Olympic Games. Pessoa, a triple Olympic medalist, was also the nation's flag bearer at the opening ceremony. Meanwhile, three athletes made their fifth Olympic appearance: beach volleyballer and double medalist Emanuel Rego, sailor and multiple-time medalist Robert Scheidt, and football player Formiga. Equestrian eventing rider Serguei Fofanoff, at age 43, was the oldest athlete of the team, while slalom kayaker Ana Sátila was the youngest at age 16.

Other notable Brazilian athletes featured NBA basketball players Leandro Barbosa and Tiago Splitter, taekwondo jin and bronze medalist Natália Falavigna, double New York marathon champion Marílson dos Santos, and medley swimmer and multiple-time Pan American games medalist Thiago Pereira.

| width=78% align=left valign=top |

The following is the list of number of competitors participating in the Games. Note that reserves in fencing, field hockey, football, and handball are not counted as athletes:

Archery

Brazil qualified one archer.

Athletics

Brazilian athletes achieved qualifying standards in the following athletics events (up to a maximum of 3 athletes in each event at the 'A Standard, and 1 at the 'B' Standard):

Men
Track & road events

* Reserve

Field events

Combined events – Decathlon

Women
Track & road events

* Reserve

Field events

Basketball

Both Brazil's men and women basketball teams qualified for the events.

 Men's team event – 1 team of 12 players
 Women's team event – 1 team of 12 players

Men's tournament

Roster

Group play

Quarter-final

Women's tournament

Roster

* Iziane Castro Marques was released after indiscipline off the court before the Games. No other athlete has replaced her and the team had only 11 players.

Group play

Boxing

Brazil qualified boxers for the following events
Men

Women

Canoeing

Slalom
Brazil qualified boats for the following events

Sprint
Brazil qualified boats for the following events

Qualification Legend: FA = Qualify to final (medal); FB = Qualify to final B (non-medal)

Cycling

Brazil qualified 6 cyclists for the following events

Road
Men

Women

Mountain biking

BMX

Diving
Brazil qualified three divers for the games.

Men

Women

Equestrian

Brazil qualified the full quota in show jumping.  Brazil qualified the full quota in eventing and a single athlete in dressage.

Dressage

Eventing

Jumping

* Reserve

Fencing

Brazil qualified 3 fencers.

Men

Football

Both Brazil's men and women football teams qualified for the events.

 Men's team event – 1 team of 18 players
 Women's team event – 1 team of 18 players

Men's tournament

Team roster

Group play

Quarter-final

Semi-final

Gold medal match

Final rank

Women's tournament

Team roster

Group play

Quarter-final

Gymnastics

Artistic
Brazil qualified 3 men in the individual all-around and qualified a women's team.

Men

Women
Team

Handball

Brazil qualified for the women's event by winning the 2011 Pan American Games.

 Women's team event – 1 team of 14 players

Women's tournament

Team roster

Group play

Quarter-final

Judo

Men

Women

Modern pentathlon

Brazil qualified one athlete.

Rowing

Brazil qualified the following boats.

Men

Women

Qualification Legend: FA=Final A (medal); FB=Final B (non-medal); FC=Final C (non-medal); FD=Final D (non-medal); FE=Final E (non-medal); FF=Final F (non-medal); SA/B=Semifinals A/B; SC/D=Semifinals C/D; SE/F=Semifinals E/F; QF=Quarterfinals; R=Repechage

Sailing

Nine Brazilian sailors qualified to compete in London.

Men

Women

M = Medal race; EL = Eliminated – did not advance into the medal race

Shooting

Two Brazilian shooters qualified to compete in London.

Men

Women

Swimming

Brazilian swimmers achieved qualifying standards in the following events (up to a maximum of 2 swimmers in each event at the Olympic Qualifying Time (OQT), and 1 at the Olympic Selection Time (OST)): Glauber Silva obtained qualification for 100 m butterfly event but was removed from the Olympic team after drawing doping suspension.

Qualifiers for the latter rounds (Q) of all events were decided on a time only basis, therefore positions shown are overall results versus competitors in all heats.

Men

* Reserve

Women

Synchronized swimming

Brazil qualified 2 quota places in synchronized swimming.

Table tennis 

Brazil qualified 6 athletes.

Men

Women

Taekwondo

Tennis

Brazil qualified four different players in the men's singles and doubles competitions.
Men

Triathlon

Brazils qualified 2 men and 1 woman.

Volleyball

Beach

Indoor
The men's team qualified in third place at the 2011 FIVB Men's World Cup. The women's team secured a berth after winning the South American qualification.

Men's indoor event – 1 team of 12 players
Women's indoor event – 1 team of 12 players

Men's tournament

Team roster

Group play

Quarter-final

Semi-final

Gold medal match

Women's tournament

Team roster

Group play

Quarter-final

Semi-final

Gold medal match

Weightlifting

Brazil qualified 1 man and 1 woman.

Wrestling

Brazil qualified in the following event.

Women's freestyle

See also
Brazil at the 2011 Pan American Games
Brazil at the 2012 Winter Youth Olympics
Brazil at the 2012 Summer Paralympics

References

Nations at the 2012 Summer Olympics
2012
Summer Olympics